Vija Rožlapa (born January 8, 1942, in Liepāja) is a Latvian chess player who won the Latvian Chess Championship for women four times.

Chess career
Rožlapa learned to play chess at the age of 12.  She won Latvian Girl Championship in 1958 and Soviet Girl Championship in 1960. She fulfilled the chess master norm in 1977.

During the period from 1958 to 1983 Vija Rožlapa participated without interruption in all Latvian women's chess championships. Four times she was won this tournament (1967, 1971, 1972, 1974), five times were won second place (1961, 1965, 1970, 1975, 1979), and was four times won the third place (1963, 1968, 1976, 1980). The last time she took part in Latvian women's chess championship in 2002.

Rožlapa played for Latvia in Soviet team chess championship in 1959, 1960 (won third place at girl board), 1963 (won third place at second women board), 1967, 1969 (won second place at second women board), 1972, and 1975, and for team "Daugava" in Soviet team chess cup in 1961, 1966, 1968, 1974, and  1976.

Chess teacher and trainer
In 1964, Rožlapa decided to become a chess teacher and trainer in Riga Chess school.
Among her pupils were Alexei Shirov and Laura Rogule.

References

 Žuravļevs, N.; Dulbergs, I.; Kuzmičovs, G. (1980), Latvijas šahistu jaunrade, Rīga, Avots., pp. 105 – 106 (in Latvian).

External links
 
 
 
 
 

1942 births
Living people
Sportspeople from Liepāja
Latvian female chess players
Soviet female chess players